Geoffrey Horrocks may refer to:
Geoffrey Horrocks (mathematician) (1932/33 – 2012), British mathematician
Geoffrey Horrocks (philologist) (born 1951), British philologist